Nicole and O.J., originally titled An American Mystery is an unreleased dramatic crime thriller film centered around the tumultuous relationship between O. J. Simpson and Nicole Brown Simpson and the circumstances surrounding the 1994 murders of Nicole Brown Simpson and Ron Goldman.

Production
On June 28, 2013 it was announced that British filmmaker Joshua Newton would write and direct a movie about the O. J. Simpson murder case to be titled An American Mystery. Newton extensively researched the case and claimed to have discovered startling new evidence that would present several other suspects with both the motive and opportunity to commit the murders of Nicole Brown Simpson and Ron Goldman. The evidence is based on real court documents, witness interviews, and trial testimonies. Newton said in a statement that the project "has the capacity to challenge entrenched attitudes on a topic that has inspired visceral reactions for almost a generation."

Several people from the sports and political spectrums lent their support for the project such as former NBA player Bo Kimble, former NFL player Rosey Grier, former Texas state senator Rodney Ellis, and former U.S. Representative for California's 33rd congressional district Diane Watson, one of the film's associate producers and an inspirational force behind the project. Watson was good friends with Johnnie Cochran and said at a 2016 town hall meeting, about Cochran's portrayal in The People v. O. J. Simpson, "(he) comes across as undignified, unlikable, and obsessed with using the race card to secure an acquittal – but that's not how he was and that's not what happened. The jury gave their verdict based on the evidence – nothing else. And if anyone wants to say differently I suggest they read the actual trial transcripts. There has been a massive misrepresentation of the truth, but fortunately things are about to change and the truth is about to come out."

Principal photography involving scenes with O. J. and Nicole began in February 2018 and took place in Bulgaria, instead of Los Angeles, where the murders and trial occurred. "The reason we shot in Bulgaria was because we reconstructed O. J.'s house on Rockingham and Nicole's house on Bundy and Mezzaluna, those places don't exist anymore." Steve Small, one of the film's producers, said "It's the first time you'll see O. J.'s house inside and out."

The film was originally intended to be completed for release by summer 2014 under the title An American Mystery with a proposed budget of $65 million. After several years it was announced that the movie would be released in March 2019 under the new title Nicole and O.J. but  has still not been completed. Another 42 days are required to film the scenes involving the film's protagonist Douglas McCann, a real-life attorney who repped Simpson in a 2000 civil suit against the Verizon precursor GTE for withholding phone records the attorney claimed would exonerate Simpson.

See also
O.J.: Made in America
The People v. O.J. Simpson: American Crime Story 
American Tragedy - the 2000 TV movie

References

External links

Unreleased American films
American crime thriller films

Thriller films based on actual events
Cultural depictions of O. J. Simpson
Biographical films about criminals